Rose Valley may refer to:

 Rose Valley, Bulgaria
 Rose Valley, Saskatchewan, Canada
 Rose Valley, Chişinău, Moldova
 Rose Valley, Pennsylvania, United States
 Rose Valley, Washington, United States